The Precision 18 is an American trailerable sailboat that was designed by Jim Taylor as a cruiser and first built in 1984.

Production
The design was built by Precision Boat Works in Palmetto, Florida, United States from 1984 until 2018, with 500 boats completed.

Design
The Precision 18 is a recreational keelboat, built predominantly of fiberglass, with wood trim. It has a fractional sloop rig, a raked stem, a plumb transom, a transom-hung, kick-up rudder controlled by a tiller and a fixed stub keel, with a NACA airfoil  fiberglass centerboard that retracts into the keel. It displaces  and carries  of lead ballast.

Early boats produced have a single non-opening port on each cabin side, whereas later production models have two opening ports per side.

The boat is normally fitted with a small  outboard motor for docking and maneuvering.

The design has sleeping accommodation for four people, with a double "V"-berth in the bow cabin and two straight settee berths in the main cabin. There are no galley provisions, nor a table provided, but there is a  cooler. The head is located on the port side, amidships, under the settee.

Operational history
In a 2010 review Steve Henkel wrote, "this is an attractive, well built modern trailer-sailer with a keel-housed centerboard—what used to be called a "wholesome" boat. Below is a 40-quart cooler, and a space for a porta-pottie, but no sink, stove, or table ... Best features: Solid, neatly laid-up construction, good attention to detail ... Worst features: The basic boat comes without boom vang, backstay tensioner, reefing lines led back to the cockpit for easy singlehanding, and other small conveniences. For example, the end-boom mainsheet tackle is attached to a fitting on the backstay, an awkward reach for a singlehander sitting forward in the cockpit to balance the boat, Some owners complain that the cockpit scuppers are too small for proper draining,"

See also
List of sailing boat types

References

External links

Keelboats
1980s sailboat type designs
Sailing yachts
Trailer sailers
Sailboat type designs by Jim Taylor Yacht Designs
Sailboat types built by Precision Boat Works